The All-Ireland Senior Hurling Championship semi-finals are played to determine which teams will contest the All-Ireland Hurling Final. They are the penultimate phase of the All-Ireland Senior Hurling Championship, a hurling competition contested by the top twelve teams in Ireland. The semi-finals are usually contested at Croke Park, Dublin, however, some semi-finals, most likely replays, have been played at alternative venues.

List of semi-finals by decade

Semi-final key

1880s

1890s

1900s

1910s

1920s

1930s

1940s

1950s

1960s

1970s

1980s

1990s

2000s

2010s

2020s

See also
 List of All-Ireland Senior Hurling Championship finals
 List of All-Ireland Senior Hurling Championship quarter-finals

Semifinals
Semifinals